An irreversible circuit is a circuit whose inputs cannot be reconstructed from its outputs.
Such a circuit, of necessity, consumes energy.

See also 
Reversible computing

Integrated circuits